The Early Years Learning Framework (commonly known as EYLF), together with the National Quality Standard (or NQS), forms the policies around early childhood education in Australia.

Development of EYLF
The EYLF has been developed collaboratively by the Australian and State and Territory Governments with substantial input from the early childhood sector and early childhood academics.  The Framework has incorporated feedback from an extensive consultation process, including two national symposiums, national public consultation forums, focus groups, an online forum and case-study trials.

The Early Years Learning Framework Professional Learning Program (EYLF PLP), was developed for the Australian Government by Early Childhood Australia in 2009, to provide ongoing professional support to services as they engage in the EYLF implementation process. The program has recently been updated and expanded from the Early Years Learning Framework Professional Learning Program (EYLF PLP) to the National Quality Standard Professional Learning Program (NQS PLP). The NQS PLP has all the features of the EYLF PLP, along with a new focus to assist services to meet the National Quality Standard.

The Victorian Department of Education and Training adapted the EYLF and in 2016 published the Victorian Early Years Learning and Development Framework (VEYLDF).  The VEYLDF has been implemented across Victoria providing a framework for working with children from birth to eight years of age, which extends beyond the EYLF and covers the first years of primary school.

In April 2021 the Education Ministers of Australia announced a review and update of the EYLF.  The three phase process is due to conclude by mid-2022, with findings and feedback from a range of pilots to inform recommendations for consideration by Education Ministers.

Description
The EYLF consists of three parts, that outlines the world that educators in Australia should shape around children:

 Principles, the first part, are goals for the care, e.g. "Secure, respectful and reciprocal relationships";
 Practices are guidelines for how to achieve the goals set out in the principles, the document EYLF document includes several hands-on examples; 
 Outcomes is a list of 5 overall goals, each with 2-5 sub-goals. Each of those sub-goals has a list of things that the child could have done to meet the overall goal, serving as an easy reference for teachers (see example structure below):
 Learning Outcome 1: Children have a strong sense of identity
 Learning Outcome 2: Children are connected with and contribute to their world
 Learning Outcome 3: Children have a strong sense of wellbeing
 Learning Outcome 4: Children are confident and involved learners
 Learning Outcome 5: Children are effective communicators

See also
 Te Whāriki - New Zealand Equivalent of EYLF
 Victorian Early Years Learning and Development Framework (VEYLDF)

External links
 Department of Education, Employment and Workplace Relations
 National Quality Standard Professional Learning Program

References

Education in Australia
Education policy in Australia